Bidak Rural District is a rural district (dehestan) in the Central District of Abadeh County, Fars Province, Iran. At the 2006 census, its population was 4,715, in 1,260 families.  The rural district has 10 villages. The site of the non-operational Abadeh Airport is located on this rural district.

References 

Rural Districts of Fars Province
Abadeh County